Poems, Prayers & Promises is the fourth studio album by American singer-songwriter John Denver, released on April 6, 1971 through RCA Records. The album was recorded in New York City, and produced by Milton Okun and Susan Ruskin.
Poems, Prayers & Promises was Denver's commercial breakthrough, and contained several of his most popular songs, such as "Poems, Prayers, and Promises", "My Sweet Lady", "I Guess He'd Rather Be in Colorado", "Sunshine on My Shoulders", and "Take Me Home, Country Roads", which would become one of Denver's signature songs. "The Box", which concludes the album, is a poem by Kendrew Lascelles illustrating the futility of war.

The album peaked at number 15 on the Billboard 200.

Track listing

Personnel
 John Denver – guitars, vocals

Musicians
 Gary Chester – drums
 Bill Danoff – vocals, guitar
 Dick Kniss – double bass
 Taffy Nivert – vocals 
 Frank Owens – piano
 Mike Taylor – acoustic guitar
 Eric Weissberg – banjo, steel guitars

Production
 Ray Hall – recording engineer
 Jean Kaplow – production assistant
 Milton Okun – producer
 Don Wardell – executive producer

Charts

References

John Denver albums
1971 albums
Albums produced by Milt Okun
RCA Records albums